The Botswana International University of Science & Technology, or BIUST, is an international university located in the town of Palapye, Botswana. It is the nation's second university, after the University of Botswana in the country's capital, Gaborone. The location is a  site of gently sloping land on the outskirts of Palapye.

The university was established by the Botswana International University of Science and Technology Act of 2005 as a research intensive university that specialise in Science, Engineering and Technology at both undergraduate and postgraduate ( Masters and doctoral) levels.
Construction began in December 2009, the contractors being China Civil Engineering Construction. Phase one of the project, worth US$61.5 million (R495.6 million), was funded by the Botswana Government. Spanning two years, the phase included the construction of the administration block, halls of residence for nearly 300 students and houses for 70 staff, laboratories, auditoriums, indoor sports arena, a student centre and book shop, a clinic, and classrooms. Enrollment at the university began in March 2011 and the first semester  commenced in August of the same year. The project will accommodate 6,000 students.

Academic structure 
The university has two Faculties and a centre:

Faculty of Engineering & Technology
 Faculty of Sciences
 Centre for Business Management, Entrepreneurship and General Education

Faculty of Engineering & Technology
 Department of Mining & Geological Engineering
 Department of Mechanical, Energy & Industrial Engineering
 Department of Electrical, Computer & Telecommunications Engineering
 Department of Chemical, Material & Metallurgical Engineering

Faculty of Sciences

 Department of Earth & Environmental Sciences
 Department of Physics & Astronomy
 Department of Mathematics & Statistical Sciences
 Department of Biology & Biotechnological Sciences
 Department of Chemical & Forensic Sciences
 Department of Computer Science & Information Systems

Centre for Business Management, Entrepreneurship and General Education
 Department of  Academic Literacy and Social Sciences
 Department of Business, Management and Entrepreneurship

Student Support Services 
BIUST is a highly focused student institution which gives to its customers a conducive learning platform for its students. Guidance and counselling are the major services provided to student and the HIV awareness programs as well as recognizing the students with disabilities and learning difficulties among others.

Governance 
 H.E Festus G. Mogae (Chancellor)
 Mr. Balisi Bonyongo (Council Chairman)
 Professor Otlogetswe Totolo (Vice Chancellor)
 Distinguished Professor Dennis A. Siginer (Provost & DVC Academic )
 Mr. Dawid B. Katzke (DVC Finance & Administration)

BIUST Participates in the World Telecommunications and Informations Society Day 2017 

The World telecommunications and informations society day is an annual event celebrated in the month of May, and brings together different stake holders to discuss issues related to raising awareness about the possibilities that utilizes the internet and other information communication technologies can bring to societies and economies as well as the ways to bridge the digital divide.
17 May marks the celebration of the anniversary of the International Telecommunication Union (ITU) and signing of the first international convention center.

References

External links 
 Botswana International University of Science and Technology website
https://www.debeersgroup.com/creating-stories/2017/debswana-and-biust-sign-deal-on-skills

Universities in Botswana
Technical universities and colleges
Central District (Botswana)
Science and technology in Botswana
Scientific organisations based in Botswana
Educational institutions established in 2005
2005 establishments in Botswana